William B. Harrison Jr., (born August 12, 1943), in Rocky Mount, North Carolina, is the former CEO and chairman of JPMorgan Chase. He attended high school at Virginia Episcopal School, where he was a basketball star.  He attended the University of North Carolina at Chapel Hill, where he was admitted to the Zeta Psi fraternity.  Having risen through the ranks of Chemical Bank before succeeding Walter V. Shipley during the Chemical Bank merger with the Chase Manhattan Corporation in 1995, which kept the Chase name. As Chairman and CEO of Chase, he and Douglas A. Warner III, then CEO of J.P. Morgan & Co., were the principal architects of the US$30.9 billion acquisition by Chase of J.P. Morgan & Co. in 2000, to form JPMorgan Chase & Co.  Harrison has been a director of the Firm or a predecessor institution since 1991. Harrison is also a director of Merck & Co., Inc.

Jamie Dimon, former Bank One CEO, replaced Harrison as chairman on January 1, 2007, following Harrison's decision to step down from his chairman position of JPMorgan on December 31, 2006.

Resume
 A.B. degree in economics from the University of North Carolina
 Graduate of the Harvard Business School's International Senior Management Programme in Switzerland
Director since 1991 of JPMorgan Chase or a predecessor institution:
 Vice chairman of the board of The Chase Manhattan Corporation, 1991 through June 1999
 President and chief executive officer of The Chase Manhattan Corporation, June through Dec. 1999
 Chairman and chief executive officer of The Chase Manhattan Corporation, Jan. 2000 through its merger with J.P. Morgan & Co. Incorporated, in Dec. 2000
 President and chief executive officer of JPMorgan Chase, Dec. 2000 through Nov. 2001
 Chairman and chief executive officer of JPMorgan Chase, Nov. 2001 through Dec. 2005
 Became chairman of JPMorgan Chase on December 31, 2005

References

American bankers
American chief executives of financial services companies
1943 births
Living people
North Carolina Tar Heels men's basketball players
Harvard Business School alumni
JPMorgan Chase people
People from Rocky Mount, North Carolina
American men's basketball players